2,6-Dichlorobenzonitrile (DCBN or dichlobenil) is an organic compound with the chemical formula C6H3Cl2CN.  It is a white solid that is soluble in organic solvents.  It is widely used as an herbicide.

Mechanism of action
It has herbicidal properties killing young seedlings of both monocot and dicot species.  DCBN interferes with cellulose synthesis.  DCBN adapted cell walls use minimal amounts of cellulose, instead relying on Ca2+-bridge pectates.

Safety

In 1971 in the U.S. State of California, their department of agriculture reported, "Dichlobenil kills the roots of many species, but not all; further, the killing does not extend much beyond the portion actually soaked."

In 1996, the University of California's Statewide Integrated Pest Management Project reported:  Dosages were difficult to control... and as a result soaking or spraying methods are no longer used.      The current application method involves applying metam-sodium products in foam carriers (similar to shaving cream).

The U.S. Food & Drug Administration (FDA, a major operational division of the U.S. Department of Health & Human Services) mentions "dichlobenil" in a report entitled "Herbicidal suppression of bracken and effects on forage production."

The U.S. Department of Energy - Bonneville Power Administration has reported "high potential" for dichlobenil to enter groundwater.

Residue
According to the US Environmental Protection Agency,

Inland Fisheries Ireland has reported, "The dichlobenil residue in water almost completely dissipates in 5 to 6 months."

U.S. FDA reports on pesticide residue.

Toxicity and environment
Since 1995, the U.S. National Institutes of Health has warned about potential damage to humans during indoor usage (see products listed, below):  Leave all windows open and fans operating... Put all pets outdoors, and take yourself any your family away from treated areas for at least the length of time prescribed on the label.     In 2006, the University of Hertfordshire reported on "dichlobenil":   It is no longer approved for use within the EU. It has low solubility, is not highly volatile and has potential to leach into groundwater. It is moderately persistent in soils and very persistent in water. It is moderately toxic to mammals, aquatic organisms, honeybees and earthworms.  The report quotes a European Union regulatory effective date of 2009.

The Inland Fisheries Ireland has reported:  The registration of all dichlobenil products (including Casoron G) was revoked in Ireland from 18th March 2009, under Commission Decision 2008/754/EC of 18th September 2008. A period of grace for the disposal, storage, placing on the market and use of existing stocks expired on 18th March 2010.  The London underground found itself in violation by using dichlobenil in September 2011.

As of 2012, the United Nations' International Programme on Chemical Safety (IPCS) has advised that "the substance can be absorbed into the body by inhalation, through the skin and by ingestion...  A harmful concentration of airborne particles can be reached quickly when dispersed...  The substance may have effects on the skin. This may result in chloracne."  Further, it has advised   The substance is toxic to aquatic organisms. This substance does enter the environment under normal use. Great care, however, should be taken to avoid any additional release, for example through inappropriate disposal.  For personal protection during usage, the IPCS advises:  Particulate filter respirator adapted to the airborne concentration of the substance... Sweep spilled substance into covered sealable containers. If appropriate, moisten first to prevent dusting. Carefully collect remainder. Then store and dispose of according to local regulations.  While the ICPS warns strongly, "Do NOT let this chemical enter the environment," it does not note the contradiction that dichlobenil's usage is on the environment.

The U.S. Centers for Disease Control and Prevention (CDC) follows and cites the ICPS.

Consumer products

United States
This partial list of consumer products with "dichlobenil" as an active ingredient:
 Oblitiroot
 Root Reach
 Foaming Root Killer
 RootX

Synthesis 
Dichlobenil is produced from 2,6-dichlorotoluene via the aldoxime.

References

Herbicides
Benzonitriles
Chlorobenzenes